Eric William Classey FRES (2 November 1916 – 6 September 2008) was an English entomologist specialising in Lepidoptera.

Eric Classey was a book dealer and entomological publisher and cofounder of The Entomologist’s Gazette. He was a Fellow of the Royal Entomological Society of London.

References
Obituary, Daily Telegraph
Obituary, The Independent
 Agassiz,D. and Drake, T., 2009 Obit. Entomologist's Monthly Magazine145:110
 Anonymous 2008 Metamorphosis [obituary] News of the Lepidopterists' Society vol 50, no.3/4 Autumn/Winter 2008

1916 births
2008 deaths
English lepidopterists
Fellows of the Royal Entomological Society
20th-century British zoologists